The 1975 PGA Tour season was played from January 9 to October 26, and consisted of 42 official money events. Jack Nicklaus won the most tournaments, five, including two majors, and there were eight first-time winners. Johnny Miller won the first two events of the year for the second year in a row (he won the first three in 1974). , the  champion, won in Milwaukee in July at age 51 for his first win in nine years.

Schedule
The following table lists official events during the 1975 season.

Unofficial events
The following events were sanctioned by the PGA Tour, but did not carry official money, nor were wins official.

Awards

Notes

References

External links
PGA Tour official site
1975 season coverage at golfstats.com

PGA Tour seasons
PGA Tour